Astrocottus is a genus of marine ray-finned fishes belonging to the family Cottidae, the typical sculpins. These fishes are found in the northwestern Pacific Ocean.

Taxonomy
Astrocottus was first proposed as a monospecific genus in 1936 by the American ichthyologist Rolf Ling Bolin when he described Astrocottus leprops from the Tsugaru Strait in Japan. The 5th edition of Fishes of the World classifies the genus Astrocottus within the subfamily Cottinae of the family Cottidae, however, other authors classify the genus within the subfamily Psychrolutinae of the family Psychrolutidae.

Species
There are currently four recognized species in this genus:

References

Cottinae
Marine fish genera
Taxa named by Rolf Ling Bolin